Điện Đô Vương Trịnh Cán (1777 – 17 December 1782) was a child heir of northern Vietnam's Trịnh lords and the ninth Trịnh lord. His mother was Đặng Thị Huệ who undertook a war to retain his place as lord, but her armies were defeated by warlord Trịnh Khải. He was born and died in Thang Long (now Hanoi).

History
Trịnh Cán was born in 1777; he was sickly at birth. He became prince in 1780 after his brother Trịnh Khải abdicated. In September 1782, Trịnh Sâm died. Đặng Thị Huệ and Count Hoàng Đình Bảo helped Trịnh Cán succeed the rank of lord with the title Điện Đô vương when he was just 6 years old. Queen Đặng Thị Huệ officially controlled the royal court to help her son and Count Hoàng Đình Bảo rule, which enraged the army and civilians.

In October 1782, Dự Vũ, assistant of the coup leader Trịnh Khải, killed Hoàng Đình Bảo. He then forced Trịnh Cán to abdicate. Trịnh Cán was forced to live in exile and died one month later.

References

1777 births
1782 deaths
Trịnh lords
Monarchs who died as children